Çerçili  (formerly Ali)  is a village in Erdemli district of Mersin Province, Turkey. It is  situated in Taurus Mountains. The major economic activity is agriculture. Animal breeding is another activity.

References

Villages in Erdemli District